Glyptograpsidae is a family of crustaceans belonging to the order Decapoda.

Genera:
 Glyptograpsus Smith, 1870
 Platychirograpsus de Man, 1896

References

Decapods
Decapod families